The Hers Aqueduct (also Aqueduc des Voûtes) is one of several aqueducts, or water bridges, created for the Canal du Midi. It crosses the river Hers-Mort near the village of Renneville, south of Villefranche-de-Lauragais.  The structure was first built in 1688–1690, but the present structure is the result of modifications by Jean-Polycarpe Maguès in 1806, chief engineer on the Canal du Midi. It has been listed since 1998 as a monument historique by the French Ministry of Culture.

See also
Aqueducts on the Canal du Midi
Locks on the Canal du Midi

References

External links
Photograph on projectbabel.org
projectbabel.org

Aqueducts on Canal du Midi